The Deutsche Radio Philharmonie Saarbrücken Kaiserslautern (German Radio Philharmonic Orchestra Saarbrücken Kaiserslautern) is a German radio orchestra.  Its administrative headquarters is in Saarbrücken, at the Funkhaus Halberg.  The orchestra gives concerts at the Funkhaus Halberg and the Congresshalle in Saarbrücken, and at the Fruchthalle in Kaiserslautern.

The precursor ensemble of the orchestra date back to 1937.  In 1951, Emmerich Smola established the Rundfunkorchester Kaiserslautern for the Südwestfunk (Southwest Radio).  Separately, by 1952, funding shortages at RIAS led to the downsizing of a full symphony orchestra in the Saarland region to a chamber orchestra.  This was the Kammerorchester des Saarländischen Rundfunks, established in 1957.  This chamber orchestra gave concerts until 1972.  In 1973, this orchestra merged with the Rundfunk-Sinfonieorchester Saarbrücken.  With the consolidation of two German broadcasting networks, the Südwestfunk and SDR into the newly formed SWR, two separate orchestras from the former parent networks, the Rundfunk-Sinfonieorchester Saarbrücken of the Saarländischer Rundfunk (SR) and the Rundfunkorchester Kaiserslautern of the Südwestrundfunk were consolidated into a single ensemble, and given the new name of Deutsche Radio Philharmonie Saarbrücken Kaiserslautern (DRP) (2007).  Christoph Poppen was the first chief conductor of the combined ensemble, serving through 2011.

Since 2011, the orchestra's chief conductor has been Karel Mark Chichon.  He is scheduled to step down from the post after the 2016–2017 season.  In September 2016, the orchestra announced the appointment of Pietari Inkinen as its next chief conductor, effective with the 2017–2018 season, with an initial contract of 4 years.

Chief conductors
 Rudolf Michl (1946–1971; SR)
 Hans Zender (1972–1984; SR)
 Myung-Whun Chung (1984–1990; SR)
 Marcello Viotti (1991–1995; SR)
 Michael Stern (1996–2000; SR)
 Günther Herbig (2001–2006; SR)
 Christoph Poppen (2006–2011; DRP)
 Karel Mark Chichon (2011–2017; DRP)
 Pietari Inkinen (2017–present; DRP)

References

External links
Official website, accessed 19 March 2013

Culture of the Palatinate (region)
German symphony orchestras
Musical groups established in 2007
Oehms Classics artists